Jake Anthony Kumerow (born February 17, 1992) is an American football wide receiver who is currently a free agent. He played college football at Illinois and UW–Whitewater, and was signed by the Cincinnati Bengals as an undrafted free agent in 2015. He has also been a member of the New England Patriots, Green Bay Packers, New Orleans Saints, and Buffalo Bills.

College career
Kumerow originally attended Illinois. He caught 3 passes for 15 yards with the Illini. He then transferred to NCAA Division III school Wisconsin–Whitewater Warhawks. Kumerow finished with 158 receptions for 2648 yards and 36 touchdowns for the Warhawks.

Professional career

Cincinnati Bengals
Kumerow signed with the Cincinnati Bengals as an undrafted free agent on May 8, 2015. He was released on September 5, 2015, and was signed to the practice squad the next day, where he spent his entire rookie season. He signed a reserve/future contract with the Bengals on January 11, 2016.

Kumerow was released by the Bengals on September 3, 2016, and was signed to the practice squad during the next day. He was promoted to the active roster on December 27, 2016.

On August 9, 2017, Kumerow was waived/injured by the Bengals after suffering an ankle injury and was placed on injured reserve. He was released on September 22, 2017 with an injury settlement.

New England Patriots
On October 26, 2017, Kumerow was signed to the New England Patriots' practice squad. He was released on November 9, 2017.

Green Bay Packers

On December 26, 2017, Kumerow was signed to the Green Bay Packers' practice squad. He signed a reserve/future contract with the Packers on January 2, 2018.

On September 3, 2018, Kumerow was placed on injured reserve. He was activated off injured reserve on December 1, 2018 and made his NFL debut the following day, in a week 13 loss to the Arizona Cardinals. He also recorded his first career reception, an 11-yard pass from Aaron Rodgers, during that game. On December 23, he scored his first NFL touchdown on a 49-yard reception against the New York Jets at MetLife Stadium.

Kumerow returned to the Packers on March 11, 2019.

On April 25, 2020, the Packers re-signed Kumerow as an exclusive-rights free agent, which kept him under contract for Green Bay for another year. He was released during final roster cuts on September 5, 2020, shortly after Rodgers had publicly praised his play. As a result, Kumerow's release was later reported as a tipping point for Rodgers, who had developed a rapport with the receiver and was upset with Packers management over his departure.

Buffalo Bills
On September 8, 2020, Kumerow was signed to the practice squad of the Buffalo Bills. He was elevated to the active roster on November 7, November 14, and November 28 for the team's weeks 9, 10, and 12 games against the Seattle Seahawks, Arizona Cardinals, Los Angeles Chargers, and reverted to the practice squad after each game. He was promoted to the active roster on December 2, 2020. Kumerow caught a touchdown pass from Josh Allen against the Denver Broncos in week 15, helping convert a second and goal from the 22-yard line. He was waived on December 24, 2020 with starter John Brown returning from injured reserve.

New Orleans Saints
On December 25, 2020, Kumerow was claimed off waivers by the New Orleans Saints. He was waived on January 9, 2021. On January 13, 2021, Kumerow re-signed with the Saints practice squad. He was released on January 18.

Buffalo Bills (second stint)
On January 26, 2021, Kumerow signed a reserve/futures contract with the Buffalo Bills. In the 2021 preseason, Bills quarterback Josh Allen joked that Kumerow was his favorite wide receiver, because his only regular season catch for the Bills was for a touchdown.

On March 10, 2022, Kumerow signed a one-year contract extension with the Bills. He was placed on injured reserve on November 17.

Personal life
Kumerow is the son of former Miami Dolphins linebacker Eric Kumerow. He is also the nephew of former Dolphins defensive end John Bosa, and a cousin to Joey Bosa and Nick Bosa. His sister Cortney was an All-American basketball player at UW-Whitewater, and their youngest brother Derek also played football at Whitewater. He is also the great-grandson of Chicago mob boss Tony Accardo.

Kumerow earned the nickname “Touchdown Jesus” originally in the preseason for the Packers due to his long hair and thick beard.

NFL career statistics

References

External links

Wisconsin–Whitewater Warhawks bio
Buffalo Bills bio

Living people
1992 births
American football wide receivers
Buffalo Bills players
Cincinnati Bengals players
Green Bay Packers players
New England Patriots players
New Orleans Saints players
People from Bartlett, Illinois
Players of American football from Illinois
Sportspeople from Cook County, Illinois
Sportspeople from DuPage County, Illinois
Wisconsin–Whitewater Warhawks football players